Ulmus parvifolia 'Zettler (selling name ) is a Chinese Elm cultivar that is one of three recent (< 2006) American introductions selected for their cold hardiness (USA zone 4 tolerant).

Description
 has a strong, upright habit and excellent branching structure, bearing deep green glossy foliage that turns to an attractive autumn colour in some years.

Pests and diseases
The species and its cultivars are highly resistant, but not immune, to Dutch elm disease, and unaffected by the Elm Leaf Beetle Xanthogaleruca luteola.

Cultivation
 was selected from over 20,000 seedlings in 1975, and subsequently proved to be one of the hardiest Chinese or Lacebark Elms available in the United States, surviving  in Illinois during the winter of 1989 without sustaining any damage whatsoever.  is not known to have been introduced to Europe or Australasia.

Accessions
None known.

Nurseries
North America
North American Plants , Lafayette, Oregon, US.

References

Chinese elm cultivar
Ulmus articles missing images
Ulmus